Alternate Tyrants is a 1997 Tor alternate history anthology, edited by Mike Resnick. The anthology contains 20 short stories, with each story by a different author, and presents a scenario where an individual becomes a tyrant or dictator in a way that did not occur in real life.

Contents

See also
 List of works by Mike Resnick
 Alternate Generals

References

External links
 Alternate Tyrants at Google Books

1997 anthologies
Alternate history anthologies
Tor Books books
Cultural depictions of Augustus
Cultural depictions of John Wilkes Booth
Cultural depictions of George H. W. Bush
Cultural depictions of Julius Caesar
Cultural depictions of Caligula
Cultural depictions of Winston Churchill
Cultural depictions of Cleopatra
Cultural depictions of Albert Einstein
Cultural depictions of Mahatma Gandhi
Cultural depictions of Abraham Lincoln
Cultural depictions of Douglas MacArthur
Cultural depictions of Nelson Mandela
Cultural depictions of Napoleon
Cultural depictions of Horatio Nelson
Cultural depictions of Elvis Presley
Cultural depictions of Ronald Reagan
Cultural depictions of Pierre Trudeau
American Civil War alternate histories
World War II alternate histories
Novels set during World War III
Works set in the 1st century BC
Works set in the 1st century
Fiction set in 1970
Fiction set in 1981